Empress Xie (1135 – 13 June 1207) was a Chinese empress consort of the Song Dynasty, married to Emperor Xiaozong of Song.

As Empress 
Xie was selected as a concubine (and later consort) for Emperor Xiaozong by Empress Dowager Wu, who lamented his disinterest in women after the death of his second empress, Empress Xia. While Xie eventually became his primary consort, she had no surviving children. 

Unlike other Empresses in the Southern Song Dynasty who made an effort at participating in politics, Empress Xie had a rather politically detached personality and lived through much of the ensuing reigns until the thirteenth year of Emperor Ningzong's reign. However, she was described as "diligent, fair and frugal" when it came to managing matters in the inner palace.

Empress Xie was a reserved and non-meddling woman who lived in silence herself, having barely received any affection from her spouse and relatives. Thus, she was widely considered a tragic and lonely figure despite her elevated position.

Notes

1135 births
1207 deaths
Song dynasty empresses
Song dynasty empresses dowager
Chinese grand empresses dowager
12th-century Chinese women
12th-century Chinese people
13th-century Chinese women
13th-century Chinese people
People from Danyang
People from Zhenjiang